Shubi is a Bantu language spoken by the Shubi people in north-western Tanzania. Peter Ladefoged wrote:
We have heard labiodental stops made by a Shubi speaker whose teeth were sufficiently close together to allow him to make an airtight labiodental closure. For this speaker this sound was clearly in contrast with a bilabial stop; but we suspect that the majority of Shubi speakers make the contrast one of bilabial stop versus labial-labiodental affricate (i.e. bilabial stop closure followed by a labiodental fricative), rather than bilabial versus labiodental stop.

References

External links 
Short article on Shubi proverbs

Rwanda-Rundi languages